Martín Nicolás Campaña Delgado (born 29 May 1989) is a Uruguayan footballer who plays as a goalkeeper for Saudi Professional League club Al-Batin and the Uruguay national team.

Club career

Early career
Born in Maldonado, Campaña joined Defensor Sporting's youth setup at the age of 13, from hometown side Deportivo Maldonado. In 2006, after finishing his formation, he moved back to his previous club on loan, and was assigned to the first team in Segunda División.

In January 2008 Campaña moved to fellow second division side Atenas de San Carlos also in a temporary deal, playing regularly as his side narrowly missed out promotion.

Cerro Largo
Released by Danubio in the middle of 2008, Campaña joined Cerro Largo of the Primera División. He made his debut for the club on 9 November, starting in a 5–2 away loss to Bella Vista.

Campaña spent his first season as a backup to Fernando Pérez, but was chosen as first-choice ahead of the 2009–10 campaign, overtaking Pérez and new signing Nicolás Gentilio. He was an undisputed starter for the club during year, but suffered team relegation.

After Cerro Largo's relegation Campaña was loaned to fellow top-tier club Racing de Montevideo, for one year. A second-choice to Jorge Contreras, his only match for the club occurred on 13 November 2010 in a 2–0 loss at Danubio.

Returning to Cerro Largo for 2011–12, Campaña was again an undisputed starter as his side achieved qualification for 2012 Copa Sudamericana by finishing fourth.

Defensor Sporting
In January 2013, he moved back to his first club Defensor on a six-month loan deal. An immediate starter due to Yonatan Irrazábal's injury, he finished the season with twelve appearances.

Bought outright in June 2013, Campaña became a first-choice ahead of Irrazábal, being an important unit as his side reached the semifinals of the 2014 Copa Libertadores.

Independiente
On 12 January 2016, Campaña moved abroad for the first time in his career, after agreeing to a 18-month deal with Independiente. He made his debut for the club on 6 March, starting in a 4–1 home routing of Colón.

Campaña became an immediate starter ahead of youth graduates Diego Rodríguez and Gonzalo Rehak.

International career
Campaña represented Uruguay at under-20 level at the 2009 FIFA U-20 World Cup in Egypt, but as the third goalkeeper. He was called up by Óscar Tabárez for the 2012 Summer Olympics being held in London, Great Britain, playing all three matches of the tournament as his side was knocked out in the group stage.

Campaña made his full international debut for Uruguay on 27 May 2016, replacing Martín Silva late into a 3–1 friendly win over Trinidad and Tobago. In May 2018, he was named in Uruguay's provisional 26-man squad for the 2018 FIFA World Cup in Russia, being also included in the final list on 2 June.

Career statistics

Club

International

Honours
Independiente
Copa Sudamericana: 2017
Suruga Bank Championship: 2018

References

External links
 
 

1989 births
Living people
People from Maldonado, Uruguay
Uruguayan footballers
Association football goalkeepers
Uruguayan Primera División players
Uruguayan Segunda División players
Argentine Primera División players
Saudi Professional League players
Defensor Sporting players
Deportivo Maldonado players
Atenas de San Carlos players
Cerro Largo F.C. players
Racing Club de Montevideo players
Club Atlético Independiente footballers
Al Batin FC players
Footballers at the 2012 Summer Olympics
Olympic footballers of Uruguay
Copa América Centenario players
2018 FIFA World Cup players
2019 Copa América players
Uruguay under-20 international footballers
Uruguay international footballers
Uruguayan expatriate footballers
Uruguayan expatriate sportspeople in Argentina
Uruguayan expatriate sportspeople in Saudi Arabia
Expatriate footballers in Argentina
Expatriate footballers in Saudi Arabia